Zach Merrett (born 3 October 1995) is a professional Australian rules footballer, currently the captain of the Essendon Football Club in the Australian Football League (AFL). A medium sized midfielder standing at 1.79 metres (5 ft 10 in) tall and weighing 83 kilograms (183 lb), Merrett is able to contribute as a hard running midfielder capable of collecting a large number of uncontested possessions whilst also being capable of winning a contested ball and clearance. He was recruited by the Essendon Football Club with the twenty sixth selection in the 2013 AFL draft and made his debut in the 2014 season. Merrett is a three-time Crichton Medalist and dual All-Australian, whilst being the 41st captain of the Essendon Football Club.

Early life and junior football 
He grew up in Cobden, Victoria before boarding at Melbourne Grammar School on a cricket scholarship. Merrett participated in the Auskick program at Cobden. As a junior, Merrett played for Cobden Football Club and as a kid supported the Western Bulldogs. After a promising junior cricket career, Merrett focused on his footy and had a breakout year. He played every game for Vic Country and impressed in many, he took that form into the end of the TAC Cup season, where he was a consistent contributor for the Sandringham Dragons. Known as a ball winner in the TAC cup, he averaged 25.7 disposals a game during the tournament. He is the younger brother and former teammate of Jackson Merrett.

AFL career

Essendon (2014–present) 
After predictions Merrett would be drafted inside the top thirty in the 2013 national draft, he was recruited by the Essendon Football Club with their second selection and twenty sixth overall. Merrett made his debut in the opening round of the 2014 AFL season against North Melbourne. He was named as the substitute and came on late in the game, replacing Martin Gleeson. He was rewarded with a nomination for the 2014 AFL Rising Star after he collected 22 disposals, three tackles, and two goals in the round 11 win against Richmond.

The 2015 AFL season saw Merrett spend more time in the midfield. In August, following Essendon's 87-point loss to the Western Bulldogs in round 18, it was announced that he would miss the remainder of the season with a major stress fracture in his foot.

In round 21, 2016, he became the third youngest match day captain in Essendon history when he led the side against  at Etihad Stadium. Under his leadership, they won just their second match for the season, defeating the Suns by six points. He won the W.S. Crichton Medal as the club's best and fairest player for 2016, becoming the youngest player in 35 years to win the award. His magnificent season was capped off by polling 19 votes in the 2016 Brownlow Medal. This was the third most votes for a player whose team won three or less games, and the most for a Bombers player since Jobe Watson polled 30 votes.

Merrett was named vice-captain for the 2017 AFL season. He had another fantastic season collecting 659 disposals, receiving his first selection in the All-Australian team and being named vice-captain in the 22under22 team for the second year in a row. 

His 2018 season failed to reach the heights of his previous, after being concussed in the opening round against the Adelaide Crows. He was continuously tagged throughout the year, but showed signs of improvement as Essendon worked towards a resurgence.

In January of the 2019 pre-season Merrett injured his ankle resulting in the use of a moon boot for 2 weeks however he was available for selection in round 1. Merrett went on to return to near his best footy during the 2019 season capped off with a 2nd club best and fairest award beating new Essendon recruit Dylan Shiel.

The Essendon midfielder produced another brilliant season in 2020, averaging 26.3 disposals and 4.3 marks, a statistic ranked elite by Champion Data, in shortened quarters to finish second in the Crichton Medal. His 13 Brownlow Medal votes from 16 games, equal 11th overall, saw him rise to 12th position on the club's all-time votes leaderboard.

Before the start of the 2021 AFL season, Merrett was re-added to the club’s leadership group with fellow Bombers Michael Hurley, Andrew McGrath and club captain Dyson Heppell. This was after being removed from the club leadership in the 2020 season, which was seen by some as a surprising move. Merrett started the 2021 season in great form with 31 disposals and a goal in Essendon's round 1 loss to Hawthorn. With injuries to key midfielders, Jye Caldwell and Dylan Shiel in Essendon's Round 2 lost to Port Adelaide, much of the midfield load was placed upon Merrett. Merrett would share most of the midfield responsibilities with fellow emerging talent Darcy Parish as both of them announced themselves as one of the most damaging midfield duos of the 2021 season. This fact was made apparent in Essendon's round 11 win over the West Coast Eagles where the duo would combine for 73 disposals, 13 inside 50s, 12 clearances and 9 tackles. The performance would earn both Merrett and Parish 9 coaches votes each.  After continuing his good form through to the midway point of the season, Merrett, on June 17 2021, re-signed with the Essendon Football Club on a 6-year deal until 2027. After finishing the 2021 home and away season with 694 disposals going at an average of 31.5 disposals a game, ranked elite by Champion Data, and 103 tackles going at an average of 4.7 tackles a game, ranked above average by Champion Data, Merrett was awarded with his second All-Australian blazer.

In 2022 Zach Merrett had another consistent season finishing runner up in the Best and Fairest behind first time winner Peter Wright.  This would be the third top three finish in the Crichton Medal of his career to go along with his three wins. 

On February 21 2023, Zach was named the captain of the Essendon Football Club, succeeding Dyson Heppell.

Player profile 
Merrett plays as an outside-inside midfielder with the ability to win the ball at the source of the contest. He was regarded as one of the best footy decision makers out of the 2013 AFL draft pool and uses his left foot as a penetrating weapon to spot up team mates inside fifty. Merrett is also known for his defensive work efforts and thus far in his career averages over 5 tackles a game.

Statistics
Statistics are correct to the end of the 2022 season

|-  
! scope="row" style="text-align:center" | 2014
|  || 27 || 20 || 11 || 2 || 170 || 134 || 304 || 67 || 79 || 0.6 || 0.1 || 8.5 || 6.7 || 15.2 || 3.4 || 4.0 || 0
|- 
! scope="row" style="text-align:center" | 2015
|  || 7 || 17 || 4 || 4 || 186 || 195 || 381 || 60 || 98 || 0.2 || 0.2 || 10.9 || 11.5 || 22.4 || 3.5 || 5.8 || 1
|- 
! scope="row" style="text-align:center" | 2016
|  || 7 || 22 || 7 || 7 || 349 || 308 || 657 || 110 || 136 || 0.3 || 0.3 || 15.9 || 14.0 || 29.9 || 5.0 || 6.2 || 19
|- 
! scope="row" style="text-align:center" | 2017
|  || 7 || 22 || 9 || 8 || 382 || 277 || 659 || 95 || 122 || 0.4 || 0.4 || 21.4 || 11.8 || 30.0 || 6.4 || 4.8 || 15
|-  
! scope="row" style="text-align:center" | 2018
|  || 7 || 22 || 5 || 7 || 281 || 309 || 590 || 69 || 132 || 0.2 || 0.3 || 12.8 || 14.0 || 26.8 || 3.1 || 6.0 || 10
|-
! scope="row" style="text-align:center" | 2019
|  || 7 || 23 || 8 || 10 || 338 || 313 || 651 || 90 || 124 || 0.3 || 0.4 || 14.7 || 13.6 || 28.3 || 3.9 || 5.4 || 16
|-  
| scope=row | 2020 ||  || 7 || 16 || 2 || 2 || 221 || 199 || 420 || 69 || 55 || 0.1 || 0.1 || 13.8 || 12.4 || 26.3 || 4.3 || 3.4 || 13
|-
! scope="row" style="text-align:center" | 2021
|  || 7 || 23 || 4 || 7 || 361 || 364 || 725 || 97 || 112 || 0.2 || 0.3 || 15.7 || 15.8 || 31.5 || 4.2 || 4.9 || 20
|-  
! scope="row" style="text-align:center" | 2022
|  || 7 || 19 || 6 || 6 || 297 || 275 || 572 || 75 || 82 || 0.3 || 0.3 || 15.6 || 14.5 || 30.1 || 4.0 || 4.3 || 17
|- 
|- class="sortbottom"
! colspan=3| Career
! 184
! 56
! 53
! 2585
! 2374
! 4959	
! 732	
! 940	
! 0.3 
! 0.3
! 14.1
! 12.9
! 27.0
! 4.0
! 5.1
! 111
|}

Notes

Honours and achievements 
Individual
 Essendon Football Club captain: 2023–
 3xW.S. Crichton Medal: 2016, 2019,2021
 2× All-Australian team: 2017, 2021
 3× 22under22 team: 2016, 2017, 2018
 2014 AFL Rising Star: nominee

References

External links

 
 

1995 births
Living people
Essendon Football Club players
Sandringham Dragons players
Australian rules footballers from Victoria (Australia)
People educated at Melbourne Grammar School
Crichton Medal winners
All-Australians (AFL)
Australia international rules football team players